"Stuck Inside a Cloud" is a song by George Harrison and is the seventh track to his posthumous album Brainwashed. It was released to radio stations in the United States and the United Kingdom in 2002, peaking at number 27 on Billboard's Adult Contemporary chart in the US in 2003, and peaking at number 15 on Billboard's Adult Alternative Airplay charts in 2003.

Harrison's favourite number was seven, and his favourite track on any of his albums was always the seventh. Dhani Harrison chose "Stuck Inside a Cloud" as his personal favourite track from his father's Brainwashed album, and thus gave it the "honour" of being the seventh track. Dhani Harrison explains in detail his late father's system for picking the sequence of songs on his albums on the Brainwashed DVD bundled with the bonus edition.

Track listing
Promo CD GEORGE1 (UK), DPRO-17572 (U.S.)
"Stuck Inside a Cloud"

Personnel
 George Harrison – lead and backing vocals, acoustic guitar, slide guitar
 Jeff Lynne – bass guitar, electric guitar, piano
 Dhani Harrison – Wurlitzer electric piano
 Jim Keltner – drums

External links
eil.com listing: George Harrison Stuck Inside A Cloud UK Promo 5" CD SINGLE (230241)
eil.com listing: George Harrison Stuck Inside A Cloud USA Promo 5" CD SINGLE (227999)
[ George Harrison: Artist Chart History]

2002 songs
George Harrison songs
Song recordings produced by George Harrison
Song recordings produced by Jeff Lynne
Songs written by George Harrison
Songs released posthumously